The Centre for Community Health and Disease Control (CCHDC) is a department within the Ministry of Health and Family of the Republic of Maldives, tasked with carrying out preventive health services in the archipelago. The department was previously known as the Department of Public Health.

Medical and health organisations based in the Maldives
Government of the Maldives